Rosie Valland is a Canadian singer-songwriter from Granby, Quebec. She is most noted as a two-time SOCAN Songwriting Prize nominee, receiving nominations in 2016 for "Olympe" and in 2017 for "Nord-Est".

Valland studied music at the École internationale de la chanson de Granby before releasing a self-titled EP in 2014. Her full-length debut album, Partir avant, followed in 2015. She then followed up with the EPs Nord-Est in 2016 and Synchro in 2017, before releasing her second full-length album Blue in 2020.

Discography
Rosie Valland (2014)
Partir avant (2015)
Nord-Est (2016)
Synchro (2017)
Blue (2020)
Emmanuelle (2022)

References

External links

Canadian women singer-songwriters
Canadian singer-songwriters
Canadian women pop singers
French-language singers of Canada
French Quebecers
Singers from Quebec
People from Granby, Quebec
Living people
Year of birth missing (living people)
21st-century Canadian women singers